Cordy is a surname, masculine given name and feminine nickname (short for Cordelia) which may refer to:

Surname:
Annie Cordy, stage name of Belgian film actress and singer Baroness Léonie Cooreman (born 1928)
Ayce Cordy (born 1990), former Australian rules footballer
Brian Cordy (born 1961), former Australian rules footballer
Graeme Cordy (born 1962), former Australian rules footballer
James Cordy (born 1950), Canadian computer scientist and educator
Jane Cordy (born 1950), Canadian Senator representing Nova Scotia
Michael Cordy, British novelist born in Ghana
Napoleon Cordy (1902–1977), amateur scholar in the field of pre-Columbian Mesoamerican civilizations
Neil Cordy (born 1959), former Australian rules footballer and now television presenter
Raymond Cordy (1898–1956), French film actor born Raymond Cordiaux
Ross Cordy, the branch chief of archaeology in the State of Hawaii's Historic Preservation Division
Zaine Cordy (born 1996), Australian rules footballer

Given name:
Cordy Glenn (born 1989), National Football League player
Cordy Milne (1914–1978), American international motorcycle speedway rider
Cordy Ryman (born 1971), American artist
C. T. Vivian (born 1924), American minister, author and close friend and lieutenant of Martin Luther King Jr.

Nickname:
Cordelia Scaife May (1928–2005), American philanthropist
Cordelia Chase, fictional character from the TV series Buffy the Vampire Slayer

See also
Alana Cordy-Collins, professor of anthropology at the University of San Diego
Roddy Cordy-Simpson (born 1944), retired British Army general